Polymeridium is a genus of fungi in the family Trypetheliaceae. The genus was originally circumscribed as a section of the genus Arthopyrenia by Swiss lichenologist Johannes Müller Argoviensis in 1883. Richard Harris elevated it to generic status in 1980.

Species
Polymeridium albidoreagens 
Polymeridium albidovarians 
Polymeridium albidum 
Polymeridium albocinereum 
Polymeridium alboflavescens 
Polymeridium albopruinosum 
Polymeridium bambusicola  – Argentina
Polymeridium bengoanum 
Polymeridium brachysporum 
Polymeridium catapastoides 
Polymeridium catapastum 
Polymeridium contendens 
Polymeridium corticatum  – Brazil
Polymeridium costaricense 
Polymeridium endoflavens  – Brazil
Polymeridium fernandoi  – Sri Lanka
Polymeridium inspersum 
Polymeridium jordanii 
Polymeridium julelloides  – Brazil
Polymeridium longiflavens  – Brazil
Polymeridium microsporum 
Polymeridium multiforme 
Polymeridium multiseptatum 
Polymeridium neuwirthii 
Polymeridium ocellatum 
Polymeridium pyrenastroides 
Polymeridium pyrenuloides 
Polymeridium quinqueseptatum 
Polymeridium refertum 
Polymeridium rhodopruinosum  – Puerto Rico
Polymeridium siamense 
Polymeridium stramineoatrum 
Polymeridium submuriforme 
Polymeridium subvirescens 
Polymeridium suffusum 
Polymeridium sulphurescens 
Polymeridium tribulationis 
Polymeridium xanthoexcentricum  – Bolivia
Polymeridium xanthopleurothecium  – Panama
Polymeridium xanthoreagens

References

Trypetheliaceae
Dothideomycetes genera
Taxa described in 1883
Taxa named by Johannes Müller Argoviensis